Herman Evan Gordon (March 12, 1896 - March, 1979) was an American baseball player in the Negro leagues. He played professionally from 1920 to 1924 with several teams.

References

External links
 and Seamheads

1896 births
1979 deaths
Cleveland Browns (baseball) players
St. Louis Stars (baseball) players
Kansas City Monarchs players
Baltimore Black Sox players
Baseball players from Virginia
People from Spotsylvania County, Virginia
Sportspeople from Chester, Pennsylvania
Toledo Tigers players
20th-century African-American sportspeople
Baseball pitchers